Abhayākaragupta (Wylie: 'jigs-med 'byung-gnas sbas-pa) was a Buddhist monk, scholar and tantric master (vajracarya) and the abbot of Vikramasila monastery in modern-day, Bihar in India. He was born in somewhere in Eastern India, and is thought to have flourished in the late 11th-early 12th century CE, and died in 1125.

Abhayākaragupta's magnum opus, the Vajravali, is a "grand synthesis of tantric liturgy" which developed a single harmonized tantric ritual system which could be applied to all Tantric Buddhist mandalas.

According to A.K. Warder, Abhayākaragupta developed the Mantrayana-Madhyamaka doctrine to its final Indic form. Matthew Kapstein sees him as "among the last great masters of Buddhism in India."

Overview
Some Tibetan sources identify his birthplace as Jarikhanda which Taranatha places next to Odisha. Gudrun Bühnemann identifies this as modern-day Jharkhand around the Chota Nagpur Plateau.

As a youth he went to the country of Magadha, "where he learned the five sciences and became well known as a pandit." During the reign of King Rāmapāla (c. 1075-1120), there was a great revival of Buddhism under Abhayākaragupta. He taught at the great Vikramashila Mahavihara as well as at Vajrāsana (Bodh Gaya) and Odantapuri. He is credited with many miracles including feeding the starving in the city of Sukhavati from his mendicant bowl which was replenished from heaven, and brought a dead child to life in the great cemetery of Himavana.

Abhayākaragupta's prolific scholarship extended from Mahayana doctrine and philosophy to Tantric Buddhist ritual and practice. David Seyfort Ruegg, writing about one of his main scholarly works writes:

The Munimatalamkara is one of the last of the major comprehensive treatises of Indian Buddhism, and it presents a treatment of Mahayanist thought based on the Prajnaparamita, Madhyamaka and Yogacara traditions. Although as such it is not in the narrowest sense a work of the Madhyamaka, it bears testimony to the efforts made by the later Madhyamikas systematically to elaborate a synthesis of the entire Mahayanist tradition.

The Munimatalamkara survives in Tibetan, and it was widely studied in Tibet until the 14th century when it was displaced by native treatises on similar subjects.

Another major text by Abhayākaragupta is the great Tantric work, the Vajravalimandopayika which is a systematic exposition of Tantric Buddhist ritual (a mandalavidhi) as a generic system applicable for all tantras. This work deals with preparation of the sacred space, 'installation ceremonies', tantric mandala construction (mandalakarman), and the performance of tantric consecration or initiation (abhiseka). It is probably the first generic work of its kind which is not tied to an individual tantric tradition, but was meant to be used with all tantras and mandalas. In the Vajravali, Abhayākaragupta synthesized previous Tantric ritual traditions such as those of Pundarika and Padmavajra and created a standardized 'sequence of rituals' (prakriya). In the beginning of this work, Abhaya summarizes his intent for composing it thus:

The mandala and other rituals taught by the teacher have been divided into two classes (yogatantra and yoginitantra). We shall summarize them here as clearly and as systematically as possible. Moreover, the ritual treatises compiled by (other) preceptors (acarya) lack completeness, thematic core, and lucid expression and sometimes authenticity and consistency. Therefore, we shall adorn it with all such good qualities.

Abhaya composed this work by selecting mandala systems and rituals from different tantric traditions and texts, and attempting to strike a balance between the yoginitantras and the yogatantra works.

His other Tantric works expound in detail on particular practices in the Vajravali; the Niṣpannayogāvalī (Garland of Completed Yogas), contains detailed descriptions of the drawing of 26 mandalas while the Jyotirmañjari details the practice of fire rituals recommended in the Vajravali.

Tibet
Abhayākaragupta's school of Buddhism flourished in India until the invasions of the Turks in the 13th century killed or scattered them; but his teachings were continued and revered in Tibet. Through his works at Vikramasila, he exerted great influence on the formation of Tibetan Buddhism, particularly during the twelfth through fourteenth centuries.

In the lineage of the Tibetan Panchen Lamas there were considered to be four Indian and three Tibetan incarnations of Amitābha Buddha before Khedrup Gelek Pelzang, who is recognised as the 1st Panchen Lama. The lineage starts with Subhuti, one of the original disciples of Gautama Buddha. Abhayākaragupta is considered to be the fourth Indian incarnation of Amitabha Buddha in this line.

Works
Abhayakaragupta was a prolific scholar who wrote many works in Sanskrit and also translated sadhana texts into Tibetan. The Tibetan canon lists 27 works by him including:

Vajravalimandopayika, a treatise on Buddhist Tantra
Amnaya-mañjari, a commentary on the Samputatantra
Marmakaumudī ('Moonlight of Points'), commentary on the Perfection of Wisdom Sutra in Eight Thousand Lines.
Ocean of Means of Achievement (Tib. sgrub thabs rgya mtsho)
Munimatālaṃkāra ('Ornament to the Subduer's Thought', Tib. thub pa'i dgongs rgyan), an encyclopedic Mahayana treatise based on Maitreya's Abhisamayalankara. 
Niṣpannayogāvalī (Garland of Completed Yogas), a text which explains how to draw 26 kinds of mandalas.
Jyotirmañjari, discusses fire ritual (homa)
Kālacakrāvatāra (Introduction to the Wheel of Time)
Upadeshamañjari, explicates the generation stage and completion stage.

Footnotes

Indian scholars of Buddhism
Panchen Lama
Tibetan Buddhists from India
Monks of Vikramashila